Amin Mirzazadeh (born 8 January 1998) is an Iranian Greco-Roman wrestler. He won the silver medal in the 130 kg event at the 2022 World Wrestling Championships held in Belgrade, Serbia. He represented Iran at the 2020 Summer Olympics held in Tokyo, Japan.

He won the gold medal in the 130 kg event at both the 2020 Asian Wrestling Championships held in New Delhi, India and the 2021 U23 World Wrestling Championships held in Belgrade, Serbia.

Career 

In 2019, he represented Iran at the Military World Games held in Wuhan, China and he won one of the bronze medals in the 130 kg event.

In 2020, he won the gold medal in the 130 kg event at the Asian Wrestling Championships held in New Delhi, India. In the final, he defeated Kim Min-seok of South Korea. In 2021, he won the gold medal in his event at the 2021 Wladyslaw Pytlasinski Cup held in Warsaw, Poland.

In August 2021, he lost his bronze medal match against Rıza Kayaalp of Turkey in the men's 130 kg event at the 2020 Summer Olympics held in Tokyo, Japan. In November 2021, he won the gold medal in the 130 kg event at the U23 World Wrestling Championships held in Belgrade, Serbia.

Achievements

References

External links 
Amin Mirzazadeh on Instagram
 

Living people
1998 births
Sportspeople from Khuzestan province
Iranian male sport wrestlers
Asian Wrestling Championships medalists
World Wrestling Championships medalists
Wrestlers at the 2020 Summer Olympics
Olympic wrestlers of Iran
20th-century Iranian people
21st-century Iranian people